Sonja Pfeilschifter (born 29 January 1971) is a German rifle shooter. After winning the 1991 World Junior Championship in 10 metre air rifle, she won the World Championships of 1994 and 1998, in 1998 doubling with a victory in 50 metre rifle three positions. Still without Olympic medals, she has a very large number of victories at ISSF World Cups and she holds several world records.

Olympic results

Records

External links 

 
 
 
 

1971 births
Living people
German female sport shooters
ISSF rifle shooters
World record holders in shooting
Olympic shooters of Germany
Shooters at the 1992 Summer Olympics
Shooters at the 2000 Summer Olympics
Shooters at the 2004 Summer Olympics
Shooters at the 2008 Summer Olympics
Shooters at the 2012 Summer Olympics
People from Cham, Germany
Sportspeople from the Upper Palatinate
21st-century German women